KRZA (88.7 FM) is a National Public Radio-affiliated station in Alamosa, Colorado. It primarily features National Public Radio programming.

See also
List of community radio stations in the United States

External links
 KRZA official website

NPR member stations
Community radio stations in the United States
RZA